Maxton is a town in Robeson and Scotland counties, North Carolina, United States. The population was 2,426 at the time of the 2010 U.S. Census.

History
The Maxton area was first settled in the 18th century. The community was incorporated in 1874 under the name of Shoe Heel. The name changed to Tilden, in honor of 1876 U.S. President candidate Samuel J. Tilden. The name reverted to Shoe Heel in 1881 before finally settling on Maxton in 1887.

As agriculture in the industry consolidated into larger corporate ventures in the 1960s, Maxton's status as a local market town declined. Far away from major transportation links such as Interstate 95, its economy continued to wane in following decades without the arrival of new industry. White people began leaving in search of better prospects, leading Maxton to become a majority-black town by 2000. With a newly elected government comprising many black officials, the town began expanding its incorporated limits to include many old black neighborhoods. In 2004 a highway bypass around the town was completed, depriving local businesses of the spending of travelers they had hitherto enjoyed.

The Maxton Historic District was listed on the National Register of Historic Places in 1999.

Educational institutions 
Maxton is the location of several former, but historically important schools.

Flora MacDonald College was founded in 1841. It was the first college in North Carolina to grant degrees to women.

Charles N. Hunter a famous African-American educator who would go on to found the North Carolina Industrial Association opened his first school in Maxton.

Carolina College was a Methodist college for women which operated in Maxton, North Carolina, from 1912 to 1926.

Carolina Military Academy (Maxton, North Carolina) was a military school for boys (7th - 12th grade + post graduate) which operated in Maxton, North Carolina, from 1963 to 1972. The school opened it doors to female day students during the 1970 - 1971 school year.

Confrontation between the Lumbee and the Ku Klux Klan

In January 1958, the Ku Klux Klan burned crosses on the lawns of two Lumbee families. A few nights later, on January 18, 1958, the Lumbee surrounded and disrupted a public Klan rally near Maxton, dispersing the Klansmen, some of whom left under police protection while others escaped into the woods. The confrontation made national headlines, and the Klan never again held a public rally in Robeson County, even as they gained influence over the next decade in North Carolina. The Lumbee refer to the event as the Battle of Hayes Pond, and celebrate it as a holiday.

Geography
Maxton is located at  (34.738147, -79.351068).

According to the United States Census Bureau, the town has a total area of 2.2 square miles (5.8 km2), all land.

Demographics

2020 census

As of the 2020 United States census, there were 2,110 people, 1,006 households, and 644 families residing in the town.

2000 census
As of the census of 2000, there were 2,551 people, 985 households, and 676 families residing in the town. The population density was 1,145.3 people per square mile (441.7/km2). There were 1,073 housing units at an average density of 481.7 per square mile (185.8/km2). The racial makeup of the town was 25.52% White, 64.09% African American, 7.02% Native American, 0.31% Asian, 0.16% Pacific Islander, 1.10% from other races, and 1.80% from two or more races. Hispanic or Latino of any race were 1.61% of the population.

There were 985 households, out of which 31.7% had children under the age of 18 living with them, 36.3% were married couples living together, 28.4% had a female householder with no husband present, and 31.3% were non-families. 27.9% of all households were made up of individuals, and 11.7% had someone living alone who was 65 years of age or older. The average household size was 2.58 and the average family size was 3.16.

In the town, the population was spread out, with 29.3% under the age of 18, 9.1% from 18 to 24, 26.0% from 25 to 44, 22.7% from 45 to 64, and 12.9% who were 65 years of age or older. The median age was 34 years. For every 100 females, there were 84.1 males. For every 100 females age 18 and over, there were 78.0 males.

The median income for a household in the town was $23,143, and the median income for a family was $30,039. Males had a median income of $27,259 versus $20,218 for females. The per capita income for the town was $12,783. About 23.7% of families and 28.5% of the population were below the poverty line, including 43.4% of those under age 18 and 22.3% of those age 65 or over.

Notable people
 Angus McLean (1870–1935) – Governor of North Carolina 1924–1928.
 Malcolm ("Malcom") McLean (1913–2001) – trucking industry innovator and "father of containerization".
 Alice B. Russell (1892–1984) – singer and actress married to Oscar Micheaux.
 Allen LaGrant "Mickey" Bowers (1949-) is a retired American professional baseball player, scout, coach and manager whose entire uniformed career took place in minor league baseball.
 Gilbert Brown Patterson (1863 – 1922) was an American politician and a member of the United States House of Representatives from North Carolina.
 Effie Neal Jones (1919-2002) - civil rights activist, Food Services Director, and Counselor for the Four County Head Start Program

References

Works cited

External links

City of Maxton official website

Towns in Robeson County, North Carolina
Towns in Scotland County, North Carolina
Towns in North Carolina
Populated places established in the 1700s